Eesti Hoiupank (Estonian for Estonian Savings Bank) was an Estonian bank which operated from 1992 to 1998. Once the 3rd largest bank in the country, Hoiupank merged into Hansapank (currently Swedbank's Estonian subsidiary) in 1998.

References

External links
AAAdir entry

Defunct banks of Estonia
Banks established in 1992
Banks disestablished in 1998
Estonian companies established in 1992
1998 disestablishments in Estonia